Chandpur Science & Technology University is a government financed public university of Bangladesh.

History 
The Cabinet approved the draft bill Chandpur Science and Technology University Act 2019 on 23 December 2019. The bill to establish Chandpur University of Science and Technology was passed in the parliament on 9 September 2020. Nasim Akhtar was appointed to a four-year term as the vice chancellor of the university in January 2021.
 
In January 2022, reports surfaced that between December 2019, when the university was approved by the cabinet, and April 2021, when a site was selected and acquisition of land for the university was approved, relatives and associates of Education Minister Dipu Moni had acquired nearly 62.5 acres where the permanent campus is to be built. Allegedly, the acquisitions, in some cases forcible, were recorded at much higher purchase prices than what was actually paid, inflating land prices nearly twenty-fold in an effort to make a 3.59 billion Bangladeshi taka ($42 million as of 2022) profit off of the government's subsequent land purchase. Moni denied any wrong doing on the part of herself or her family.

List of vice-chancellors

Course 

 B.Sc (Eng.) : Computer Science and Engineering (CSE)
 B.Sc (Eng.) : Information and Communication Technology (ICT)

Proposed

 B.Sc (Eng.) : Civil Engineering (CE)
 B.Sc (Arch.) : Architecture (ARCH)

References

External links 
 University Grants Commission of Bangladesh

Chandpur Science and Technology University